Adar is a surname. Notable people with the surname include:

Jimmy Adar (born 1987), Ugandan middle-distance runner
Tamar Adar (1939–2008), Israeli writer
Yasemin Adar (born 1991), Turkish female freestyle wrestler

Fictional characters:
President Adar, character in the original Battlestar Galactica
Richard Adar, character in the reimagined Battlestar Galactica